The Singles is a singles, b-sides and rarities compilation CD from the indiepop band Tullycraft. It compiles early seven inch singles & split singles, compilation tracks, and a couple live radio performances. The majority of the songs were recorded during the period between the band’s first two albums, Old Traditions, New Standards and City of Subarus.

Track listing
 "Skyway"
 "Superboy & Supergirl"
 "Pop Songs Your New Boyfriend's Too Stupid to Know About"
 "Pink Lemonade"
 "Bailey Park"
 "Pedal" [Crayon]
 "Josie"
 "1st String Teenage High"
 "Not Quite Burning Bridges"
 "Piano Lessons for Beauty Queens"
 "Stay Cool I'll See You This Summer"
 "Falling Out of Love (with you)" [6ths]
 "Guyana Punch" [Judy's]
 "She's Got the Beat" [Judy's]
 "Break Seaside (and over)"
 "Maybe Baby" [Ninjas]
 "Heroes and Villains" [Pooh Sticks]
 "They're Not Trying on the Dance Floor" [Jonathan Richman]
 "8 Great Ways"
 "Crush the Scene (live)"
 "Look How We Killed the Riot Grrrls (live)"
 "Loveless (live)" [New Order]

Personnel
 Sean Tollefson – vocals, bass
 Jeff Fell – drums, bass
 Gary Miklusek – guitar, backing vocals, keyboard
 Chris Munford – guitar, keyboard, backing vocals
 Harold Hollingsworth – lead guitar

Jen Abercrombie – vocals on "Heroes and Villains"
 Robynn Iwata – vocals on "Josie"
 Pat Maley – backing vocals on "Guyana Punch"
 Rose Melberg – backing vocals on "Pedal"

References 

 Strong, M. C. (2003). The Great Indie Discography (2nd Edition) pg. 1041. Published by Canon Books Ltd. (US/CAN) .

Tullycraft albums
1999 albums